The women's hammer throw at the 2014 European Athletics Championships took place at the Letzigrund on 13 and 15 August.

Medalists

Records

Schedule

Results

Qualification

69.50 (Q) or at least 12 best performers (q) advanced to the Final.

Final

References

Hammer Throw W
Hammer throw at the European Athletics Championships
2014 in women's athletics